Phytoecia mongolorum is a species of beetle in the family Cerambycidae. It was described by Namhaidorzh in 1979. It is known from Mongolia.

References

Phytoecia
Beetles described in 1979